Lazaros Varzis was a Greek chieftain of the Macedonian Struggle.

Biography 
He was born in the mid 19th century in Kontziko (now Galatini) of Kozani. He participated in the 1878 Greek Macedonian rebellion and in the 1896–1897 Greek Macedonian rebellion, initially as a soldier and later as a co-leader of a small armed group, in the group of Athanasios Broufas. During the Macedonian Struggle, he was a chieftain and acted mainly in the area of Almopia, from June 1906 to March 1908 against the Bulgarian komitadjis and the Ottoman authorities, often collaborating with the officer Athanasios Exadaktylos. He came in contact with Traianos Bragiannis to facilitate his passage to Greece.

Sources & References 
 John S. Koliopoulos (editor), Αφανείς, γηγενείς Μακεδονομάχοι, Εταιρεία Μακεδονικών Σπουδών, University Studio Press, Thessaloniki, 2008, p. 103
 Αρχείο Διεύθυνσης Εφέδρων Πολεμιστών Αγωνιστών Θυμάτων Αναπήρων (ΔΕΠΑΘΑ), Αρχείο Μακεδονικού Αγώνα, φ. Β-164

Greek people of the Macedonian Struggle
Greek Macedonians
Macedonian revolutionaries (Greek)
People from Askio, Kozani
Greek people from the Ottoman Empire